The Liverpool Privateers  are a Canadian Junior ice hockey team from Liverpool, Nova Scotia.  The Privateers play in the Nova Scotia Junior Hockey League. and are the 2006 Don Johnson Cup Maritime Junior B Champions.  They were established as the Bay Ducks, based in Upper Tantallon, Nova Scotia.

History
Founded in 2005, as the Bay Ducks, the Privateers have been one of the more dominant teams in the Nova Scotia Junior Hockey League.  In their first season, the Ducks made it all the way to the NSJHL final where they lost to the Antigonish Bulldogs.  Due to Newfoundland electing not to send a champion to the 2006 Don Johnson Cup the Ducks were allowed to take the NL seed.  Taking full advantage, the Ducks started the tournament with a 5–1 win over the host Kensington Vipers.  They then dropped a 1–0 decision to the Island Junior Hockey League Champion Sherwood Falcons.  In their final round robin game, the Ducks defeated Antigonish 5–3 to clinch first in the round robin (2–1–0) and a bye directly into the tournament final.  The Ducks again met Antigonish in the final and dispatched them 5–3 to win their first and only Don Johnson Cup.

After a 22–8–4 record during the 2010–11 regular season and a second-place finish, the Ducks would win their first ever league playoff championship.  At the 2011 Don Johnson Cup in Montague, Prince Edward Island, the Ducks would finish the round robin in third place with a record of two wins, a loss, and a regulation tie.  The Ducks defeated the Tri County River Cats of the New Brunswick Junior B Hockey League 2–1 to open the tournament.  In their second game, the Ducks defeated the St. John's Jr. Celtics of the St. John's Junior Hockey League 6–4.  On the final day of the round robin, the Ducks played two games, first dropping a 9–6 decision to the Island Junior Hockey League's Kensington Vipers and finished with a 4–3 overtime loss to the host Montague Maniacs.  The Ducks met the Kensington Vipers again in the tournament semi-final and dropped a 4–3 double overtime decision to them to end any hope of a second Don Johnson Cup for that season.

Prior to the commencement of the 2014–15 season the Bay Ducks relocated to Liverpool, Nova Scotia and re-branded their team name to the Privateers.

Season-by-season record

Don Johnson Cup
Eastern Canada Jr B Championships

 Advanced to Don Johnson Cup as a replacement for Newfoundland champion.

External links
Liverpool Privateers Official Site

Ice hockey teams in Nova Scotia
2005 establishments in Nova Scotia
Ice hockey clubs established in 2005